The 1973 South Glamorgan County Council election was the first election to South Glamorgan County Council and was held in April 1973. It was followed by the 1977 election.

Candidates
Conservative and Labour candidates contested the vast majority of seats. In contrast there were relatively few Liberal and Plaid Cymru candidates. In Cardiff, many members of the previous County Borough Council sought election to both the new South Glamorgan authority and the new Cardiff City Council (where the elections were held a few weeks later).

Outcome
Glamorgan was the only county to be divided as a result of local government re-organization in England and Wales from 1 April 1974. Previous proposals proposed by the Labour Party had envisaged a division into two new counties, East and West. However, the Conservatives favoured the creation of South Glamorgan given that they entertained hopes of winning control.

The first elections were in May 1973 and councillors would act in a shadow capacity for the next 11 months, setting up the various functions, until the new council came into effect. Labour won a small majority (though subsequently allocated themselves 15 of the 20 seats on the steering committee), largely as a result of winning most of the seats in Cardiff and also in the port of Barry.

Summary of results

This section summarises the detailed results which are noted in the following sections. This was the inaugural county election and therefore no comparison can be made with the previous elections.

This table summarises the result of the elections in all wards. 80 councillors were elected.

|}

Ward Results

Adamsdown (two seats)

Barry, Baruc (one seat)

Barry, Buttrills (one seat)

Barry, Cadoc (one seat)

Barry, Castleland (one seat)

Barry, Court (two seats)

Barry, Dyfan (two seats)

Barry, Illtyd (one seat)

Councillor Mackillican won by one vote after four recounts. This was the smallest majority in the country at these elections. Mrs Elsworth had won the Illtyd ward for the Vale of Glamorgan Borough Council in 1972 by only four votes.

Canton (two seats)

Cardiff Rural No.1 (one seat)

Cardiff Rural No.3 (two seats)

Cardiff Rural No.4, Wenvoe (one seat)

Cardiff Rural No.5, Rhoose (one seat)

Cardiff South (two seats)

Cathays (three seats)

Central (two seats)

Cowbridge No.1 (one seat)

Cowbridge No.2 (two seats)

Ely (four seats)

Gabalfa (three seats)

Grangetown (two seats)

Lisvane, Llanedeyrn and St Mellons (one seat)

Llandaff (three seats)

Llanishen (four seats)

Penarth North/Central (two seats)

Penarth South Ward (two seats)

Penarth West (one seat)

Penylan (five seats)

Plas Mawr (four seats)

Plasnewydd (two seats)

Rhiwbina (three seats)

Riverside (two seats)

Roath (three seats)

Rumney (five seats)

Splott (five seats)

Whitchurch (three seats)

 

KEY

o indicates sitting councillor on Cardiff City Council prior to 1973 election
 
 indicates sitting alderman on Cardiff City Council prior to 1973 election

References

South Glamorgan
South Glamorgan County Council elections